Filton and Bradley Stoke is a constituency represented in the House of Commons of the UK Parliament since 2010 by Jack Lopresti, a Conservative.

History 

The seat was created by the Boundary Commission for the 2010 general election. The seat was formed by taking parts of the Bristol North West, Kingswood, and Northavon constituencies.

The electoral wards used to create the seat in time for the 2010 election were:

 Almondsbury, Bradley Stoke Central & Stoke Lodge, Bradley Stoke North, Bradley Stoke South, Downend, Filton, Frenchay & Stoke Park, Patchway, Pilning and Severn Beach, Staple Hill, Stoke Gifford and Winterbourne, all in the South Gloucestershire (unitary) district

Members of Parliament

Elections

Elections in the 2010s

See also 
 List of parliamentary constituencies in Avon
 Terry Marsh – who changed his name to "None of the Above X" to stand in the 2010 general election

Notes

References

Parliamentary constituencies in South West England
South Gloucestershire District
Constituencies of the Parliament of the United Kingdom established in 2010